Titinius was an ancient Roman soldier who fought at the Battle of Phillipi as a centurion in the army of Gaius Cassius Longinus.

Titinius may also refer to:
 Marcus Titinius, tribune in 450 BC
 Lucius Titinius Pansa Saccus, consular tribune in 400 BC and 396 BC
 Marcus Titinius, magister equitum in 302 BC
 Gaius Titinius Gadaeus, bandit in slave revolt used by Gaius Marius
 Marcus Titinius, commander in the time of Marius
 Titinius, poet, earliest known composer of tabernariae, survived Terence, only fragments extant
 Gnaeus Octavius Titinius Capito, official and writer in the 2nd century

See also

Titinia gens

Ancient Romans